Valentina Landuzzi (born 18 May 1994) is an Italian professional racing cyclist, who most recently rode for UCI Women's Continental Team . In August 2020, she rode in the 2020 Strade Bianche Women's race in Italy.

References

External links
 

1994 births
Living people
Italian female cyclists
Cyclists from Bologna